Nahida Sobhan is a Bangladeshi diplomat who is Bangladesh's first female diplomat in the Middle East. She became Ambassador to Jordan on January 1, 2020. Earlier, she served as the director general of the UN Department in the Ministry of Foreign Affairs.

Education 
Sobhan holds a Bachelor of Arts (Honors) and a master's degree in English literature from the University of Dhaka. She was trained in public international law at The Academy of International Law in The Hague, Netherlands. She also obtained a diploma in international relations from the Institute of Public Administration in Paris, France. She is equally fluent in French, English and Bengali.

Career
Sobhan is a career foreign service officer, belonging to 15th batch of Bangladesh Civil Service (BCS) foreign affairs cadre. Sobhan served in various capacities at Bangladesh missions in Rome, Kolkata and Geneva.

Personal life 
Nahida Sobhan is married and is the mother of two children.

References 

Living people
Year of birth missing (living people)
Place of birth missing (living people)
Bangladeshi women ambassadors
Ambassadors of Bangladesh to Jordan
University of Dhaka alumni